Coach Concepts is an Australian coach bodybuilder in Rocklea, Brisbane.

History
Coach Concepts was formed by former Coach Design partner Mark Gamer in 2004 and had bodied 190 coaches as at April 2013. Large purchasers have been Bayside Coaches of Melbourne with 20 Volvos and AAT Kings with 12 Scanias.

References

External links
Bus Australia gallery

Bus manufacturers of Australia
2004 establishments in Australia